Yal, or YAL, can mean:

Boeing YAL-1, a US Air Force test aircraft for anti-missile laser development
Yāḻ, an ancient Tamil harp
YAL, the IATA code for Alert Bay Airport in British Columbia, Canada
YAL, the National Rail code for Yalding railway station in Kent, UK
Yal (boat), a type of Russian rowboat
Yal (river), a river in South Sudan
Young Americans for Liberty, an American right libertarian association
Young Australia League, an Australian youth organisation

See also